Nafana is a town in eastern Ivory Coast. It is a sub-prefecture of Prikro Department in Iffou Region, Lacs District. The border of Zanzan District lies seven kilometres east of the town.

Nafana was a commune until March 2012, when it became one of 1126 communes nationwide that were abolished.

In 2014, the population of the sub-prefecture of Nafana was 10,623.

Villages
The 11 villages of the sub-prefecture of Nafana and their population in 2014 are:

References

Sub-prefectures of Iffou
Former communes of Ivory Coast